Hari Dutt Sharma is a Sanskrit poet who won President certificate of honor in 2015 and the Sahitya Akademi Award for Sanskrit in 2007 for his work of poetry, Lasallatika.

He was awarded with "Mahrishi Vyas Puruskar" from Uttar Pradesh Sanskrit Sansthaan, and awarded by the then Governor of Uttar Pradesh on 7-Feb-2018. He was born in  rangas village of Himachal Pradesh.

He was reappointed as Professor at Allahabad University India in 2014. He was earlier Professor and Head of the Sanskrit Department at the University of Allahabad. when he retired in June 2013, he was the visiting professor of Sanskrit at Silpakorn University in Bangkok, Thailand. He has been nominated as UGC-nominated Member several times.

Works
 Books
 Glimpses of Sanskrit Poetics and Poetry, Raka Prakashan. 

Editing of the Books
 Saṃskṛta memׂ Vijñāna evam Vaiñānika Tattva, Proceedings of the Seminar, Sanskrit Department, University of Allahabad, 2006.
 Perspectives on Comparative Religion, Proceedings of the Seminar, University of Allahabad, Vishwavidyalaya Prakashan, Sagar, 2008.

Articles
 A Psychological Study of Bhāvas in Sanskrit poetics (1972)
 "A Psychological Analysis of vibhāva" in Annals of the Bhandarkar Oriental Research Institute, Volume 63 (1983)
 The Concept of Symbolism and Sanskrit Poetry, in 13th World Sanskrit Conference, Edinburgh, July 2006
 The Concept of Poetry in Modern Sanskrit Poetics, in 14th World Sanskrit Conference, Kyoto, September 2009, Section 6 - Poetry, Drama and Aesthetics
 Sentiment, embellishment and metrical arrangement in Sanskrit poetry, Indologica Taurinensia: Journal of the International Association of Sanskrit Studies
 Impact of Indian mythology on Thai archaeology in Sanskrit in Southeast Asia : the harmonizing factor of cultures, International Sanskrit Conference, Bangkok, 2003. 
  Culture and Religion along Confluence of Rivers, in 3rd SSEASR Conference, Bali, Indonesia, June 2009

References

External links
 AU Prof felicitated , HT 8 August 2006

Recipients of the Sahitya Akademi Award in Sanskrit
Living people
Year of birth missing (living people)